Standard Time, Vol. 4: Marsalis Plays Monk is an album by the jazz trumpeter Wynton Marsalis that was released in 1999.

Reception

In a review for AllMusic, Stephen Thomas Erlewine wrote that Marsalis "avoids the obvious choices, the songs that have long been part of every jazz musician's repertoire," and "decided to give all these songs clean, direct arrangements, which makes this music more accessible." He commented: "To some listeners, it may be a little disconcerting to hear the rough edges sanded away, but these precise arrangements are quite engaging in their own right... Marsalis might not offer anything new, but...  he's made an enjoyable classicist jazz LP that happens to be an affectionate tribute to a true master."

The authors of The Penguin Guide to Jazz Recordings stated: "The standard of playing is as high and as disciplined as ever... One to admire, rather than like."

Writing for All About Jazz, C. Michael Bailey remarked: "Marsalis Plays Monk is a pleasure from start to finish... This is a very good disc. Marsalis has a special reverence for the leaders in jazz: Louis Armstrong, Duke Ellington, and Thelonious Monk."

Willard Jenkins of Jazz Times wrote: "On this disc one hears a concerted effort to avoid the gates of apathy, through conscious editing of the improvisations, varying the format to a refreshing degree, and addressing Monk’s music with a New Orleans kind of sparkle and joy, including use of polyphony, that is palpable and rewarding."

In an article for Burning Ambulance, Phil Freeman stated: "The music is as lush and genteel as most of Marsalis's work. The arrangements emphasize the stateliness of Monk's writing, a side often overlooked in favor of his deliberately rough, 'off' rhythms and jarring chords. The horn charts glide more than they punch... At its best, this album suggests an imaginary Duke Ellington album of Monk compositions."

Track listing

Personnel
 Wynton Marsalis – trumpet
 Wessell Anderson – alto saxophone
 Wycliffe Gordon – trombone
 Eric Reed – piano
 Ben Wolfe – double bass
 Reginald Veal –  double bass
 Herlin Riley – drums
 Walter Blanding – tenor saxophone
 Victor Goines – tenor saxophone

References

1999 albums
Wynton Marsalis albums
Columbia Records albums